The Main Street Bridge is an historic bridge carrying Main Street over the Pawtucket Falls in Pawtucket, Rhode Island. The bridge has been widened twice to accommodate increased traffic; the most recent widening was in the 1960s, when concrete abutments were added to the south, and the added section completed with I-beams. The bridge, built in 1858, is believed to be the oldest highway bridge in active use in the state.

The bridge was listed on the National Register of Historic Places in 1983.

See also

National Register of Historic Places listings in Pawtucket, Rhode Island
List of bridges on the National Register of Historic Places in Rhode Island

References

Bridges completed in 1858
Road bridges on the National Register of Historic Places in Rhode Island
Buildings and structures in Pawtucket, Rhode Island
National Register of Historic Places in Pawtucket, Rhode Island
1858 establishments in Rhode Island
Bridges in Providence County, Rhode Island
Stone arch bridges in the United States